A History of the Devil is a book by Gerald Messadié published in 1996. The book was originally published in France in 1993 as Histoire Générale du Diable, and was translated into English by Marc Romano.

Contents
The Ambiguous Demons of Oceania
India: Spared from Evil
China and Japan: Exorcism through Writing
Zoroaster, the First Ayatollahs, and the True Birth of the Devil
Mesopotamia: The Appearance of Sin
The Celts: Thirty-five Centuries without the Devil
Greece: The Devil Driven Out by Democracy
Rome: The Devil Banned
Egypt: Unthinkable Damnation
Africa: The Cradle of Religious Ecology
The North American Indians: Land and Fatherland
The Enigma of Quetzalcoatl: the Feathered Serpent, and the God-Who-Weeps
Israel: Demons as the Heavenly Servants of the Modern Devil
The Devil in the Early Church: The Confusion of Cause and Effect
The Great Night of the West: From the Middle Ages to the French Revolution
Islam: The Devil as State Functionary
Modern Times and the God of Laziness, Hatred, and Nihilism

References

1996 non-fiction books
Books about religion
French-language books
French non-fiction books